American singer Jessica Sutta's career began as a singer in the girl group Pussycat Dolls in 2003. The group signed a record deal with Interscope Records and they sold around 40 million singles worldwide.

Studio albums

Mixtapes

Singles

Promotional singles

As featured artist

Other appearances

Music videos

References

Pop music discographies
Discographies of American artists